Foxton Beach is a small settlement in the Horowhenua District of the Manawatū-Whanganui region of New Zealand's North Island.  It is located on the South Taranaki Bight at the mouth of the Manawatu River, 35 kilometres southwest of Palmerston North, and six kilometres west of Foxton. Foxton Beach has a permanent population of around 2000 people. The town is a popular holiday destination due mainly to its beach and the bird sanctuary at the Manawatu Estuary. Most of Foxton Beach is made up of holiday homes.

History
Te Wharangi was a large Māori settlement at the location and a riverside fishing station where canoes could be tied up.

European settlement began in the 1840s, when it became a staging point for horsedrawn travel along the coast between Wellington and Whanganui. It later became a centre for export of flax and timber by steamer.

Demographics

Foxton Beach had a population of 1,884 at the 2018 New Zealand census, an increase of 264 people (16.3%) since the 2013 census, and an increase of 183 people (10.8%) since the 2006 census. There were 822 households. There were 912 males and 972 females, giving a sex ratio of 0.94 males per female. The median age was 57.7 years (compared with 37.4 years nationally), with 228 people (12.1%) aged under 15 years, 165 (8.8%) aged 15 to 29, 822 (43.6%) aged 30 to 64, and 669 (35.5%) aged 65 or older.

Ethnicities were 89.8% European/Pākehā, 16.9% Māori, 1.3% Pacific peoples, 1.0% Asian, and 1.4% other ethnicities (totals add to more than 100% since people could identify with multiple ethnicities).

The proportion of people born overseas was 8.3%, compared with 27.1% nationally.

Although some people objected to giving their religion, 52.9% had no religion, 33.3% were Christian, 0.2% were Hindu, 0.5% were Buddhist and 2.7% had other religions.

Of those at least 15 years old, 165 (10.0%) people had a bachelor or higher degree, and 516 (31.2%) people had no formal qualifications. The median income was $23,800, compared with $31,800 nationally. The employment status of those at least 15 was that 597 (36.1%) people were employed full-time, 207 (12.5%) were part-time, and 54 (3.3%) were unemployed.

Geography and nature
Foxton Beach is located on the Manawatu Estuary at the mouth of the Manawatu River. The style of houses built in new subdivisions indicate that the permanent population is growing.

The estuary is a Ramsar site and an internationally recognised bird sanctuary, where migrating and New Zealand native birds enjoy the mudflats and wetlands. It is a feeding spot for migrating godwits.

The council has built storm surge protection consisting of concrete barriers and small hill-like barriers with a path on top, which are connected to Sunset Walk, a riverside walkway.

Recreation
The river has recreation opportunities such as bird watching, water skiing and fishing. Manawatu Marine Boating club is located at the Foxton Beach Wharf on the river. Holben / Te Wharangi Reserve has a playground, soundshell (stage) and skate park.

The beach is popular for swimming in summer and is patrolled by the Foxton Surf Life Saving Club.

Education

The nearest secondary school is Manawatū College in nearby Foxton.

References

External links 

 Foxton Beach at Horowhenua District Council
 Foxton Beach School

Populated places in Manawatū-Whanganui
Horowhenua District
Populated places on the Manawatū River